Bear River 6 is a  Mi'kmaq reserve located in Annapolis County and Digby County, Nova Scotia. It had a population of 138 individuals in 2016, an increase of 35.3% compared to 2011.

It is administratively part of the Bear River First Nation.

References

Indian reserves in Nova Scotia
Communities in Annapolis County, Nova Scotia
Communities in Digby County, Nova Scotia
Mi'kmaq in Canada